The Waynesville Municipal Building, also known as the Former US Post Office Building, is a historic post office building located at Waynesville, Haywood County, North Carolina. Its construction in 1917 was supervised by the Office of the Supervising Architect under James A. Wetmore, and is a two-story, brick rectangular building in the Classical Revival style with a one-story rear extension. It measures 58 feet by 73 feet and features brick Ionic order pilasters with granite bases and capitals. The building housed Waynesville's post office until 1966 when it was purchased by the Town of Waynesville to serve as its Municipal Building.

It was listed on the National Register of Historic Places in 1991. It is located in the Waynesville Main Street Historic District.

References

Waynesville
Neoclassical architecture in North Carolina
Government buildings completed in 1917
Buildings and structures in Haywood County, North Carolina
National Register of Historic Places in Haywood County, North Carolina
Historic district contributing properties in North Carolina
Waynesville, North Carolina